Humpy Peak is a peak located in the Uinta Mountain Range in northern Utah.

Telecommunications tower

Telecommunications and radio broadcasting occupy the mountains summit. It has a single tower near the summit that broadcasts a variety of signals to the surrounding area. The Utah Communications Agency Network (UCAN) operates a transmitter at the location. The United States Forest Service also operates a transmitter on the mountain.

Radio stations

The following FM radio stations broadcast their main signals from the tower located on Humpy Peak. Three new stations have construction permits to move to the mountain. Several other FM stations may also be pending moves to the peak.

FM stations use Humpy Peak as a transmitter location primarily because of a terrain shadow of nearby Salt Lake City. This allows the stations to drop onto 2nd adjacent frequencies in Salt Lake City, without interfering with other stations in the main market area. All of the stations listed above use booster signals that are synchronized with the main station. These fill in the gaps that the main signal otherwise wouldn't cover well. For example, KLO-FM has six boosters to cover the Salt Lake metro area, which is behind the Wasatch Mountain Range from the main transmitter. Stations like this are generally known as "rimshots."

Geology

Humpy Peak is located on the northwestern flank of the Uinta Mountain range in central Summit County. Geology of the peak is common with Uinta Mountain range as well. The peak is accessible via a road on private property, that begins at Utah State Route 150. Because of its height, and the terrain shadow the Wasatch Range provides, Humpy was likely chosen because signals from the peak cover a significant distance, well into Wyoming. This provides Evanston and surrounding communities in southwestern Wyoming with more radio stations. Stations on the peak often can be received as far northeast as Green River, Wyoming.

References

Features of the Uinta Mountains
Mountains of Utah
Mountains of Summit County, Utah
Mass media in Salt Lake City
Mountains of Uinta County, Wyoming